The Ohio State University Marching Band (OSUMB) is a university marching band named for and a part of the Ohio State University. The band, popularly nicknamed The Best Damn Band in the Land (TBDBITL) (pronounced ), performs at football games and other events during the fall semester. It is one of the few collegiate all-brass and percussion bands in the country, and sometimes deemed the largest of its type in the world.

History
The band was initially founded in 1878 as a student-led fife and drum corps that provided music for the university ROTC program. In 1896, university officials hired Gustav Bruder as the first band director. Under Bruder’s leadership, the band grew in size, and, after merging with the short-lived Varsity Band in 1920, introduced its first drum major, Edwin “Tubby” Essington.

In 1928, the band introduced the Ramp Entrance, which survives virtually unchanged today. That same year, Eugene J. Weigel became band director. During his tenure, Weigel introduced many of the hallmarks of the OSUMB, including floating and animated formations, the uniforms, and Script Ohio. Weigel also introduced the distinctive all-brass and percussion instrumentation of the ensemble in 1934.

In 1952, the band split from the ROTC and came under the auspices of the School of Music. As a result, the band began to experiment with more modern styles of music, eventually leading to the introduction of the band’s arrangement of “Hang On, Sloopy” in 1965. In 1957, director Jack Evans moved the band’s pregame rehearsal to the newly-built St. John Arena. Over time, this pregame rehearsal evolved into the traditional Skull Session that occurs before each home game. 

After the passing of Title IX legislation in 1973, women joined the band for the first time. The band expanded to 225 members shortly thereafter.

In the 2010s, the band added three spots, coming to its current size of 228.

The band made national headlines in the summer of 2014 following the release of an internal investigation into the band's culture and reported incidents of hazing. On July 22, 2014, Ohio State University released an investigation report titled "Complaint against Jonathan Waters, Director of the OSU Marching Band." In the report, the university's Office of Compliance and Integrity found that the band's "culture facilitated acts of sexual harassment" and that then-director Jon Waters knew or reasonably should have known about this culture."

On July 24, 2014, following a two-month investigation into complaints of a "sexualized" culture amongst band members, Jon Waters was fired by the University. Waters later denied the report's characterizations of the band and of his actions.

A second investigation was led by former Ohio Attorney General Betty Montgomery. The Task Force Report, released on November 18, 2014, identified a number of issues within the band, making 37 recommendations for changes, but also criticized Ohio State University for decades of lax oversight and inadequate resources for enforcing compliance. The task force final report included results of a survey of 278 then current and recent former band members (see Appendix D). The survey seemed to contradict many of the university's claims about Mr. Waters and the band.

Following Waters’ firing, OSU alumnus Dr. Christopher Hoch was promoted from interim director. Under Hoch’s leadership, the band performed at the 2018 Macy’s Thanksgiving Day Parade and the 2019 Rose Bowl.

Directors

Traditions

Script Ohio and “Dotting the I” 
The Script Ohio concept was developed and first performed by the Michigan Band in 1932. First performed by the OSUMB in 1936, Script Ohio is one of the signatures of the Ohio State University Marching Band. The band begins in a “Block O” formation. Then, to the tune of “Le Regiment de Sambre et Meuse,” the drum major leads a “peeling-off” movement that snakes across the field, forming the letters “OHIO” in cursive. At the climax of this drill maneuver, the drum major leads a sousaphone player to stand as the dot of the “i.”  Dotting the “i” is considered a high honor, and the privilege is generally bestowed on a senior sousaphone player.

There are three versions of Script Ohio: single Script, which is most common, and double Script. The double Script features all marching members of the band, including alternates, and is made up of condensed versions of the single Script that are performed to both sides of the field. Performances of the double Script are usually reserved for away or bowl games. The third version, quadruple Script, is performed once a year with the Alumni Band during halftime of the Homecoming game.

Honorary "i"-dotters 
"Dotting the 'i'" is considered the greatest honor the band can bestow to any non-band member and is a very special (and rare) event. Woody Hayes, Bob Hope, Jack Nicklaus, James "Buster" Douglas, OSU Presidents Novice Fawcett, Gordon Gee and their wives, the late composer Richard Heine, Ann Droste, wife of retired director and former OSUMB member Paul Droste, retired OSU ticket director Robert Ries, John Glenn and his wife Annie Glenn, The Limited Brands founder, chairman, and CEO Leslie Wexner (an OSU alumnus),  and former football coach Earle Bruce are the select few non-band members who have had the honor of dotting the "i". The fourth- or fifth-year sousaphone player selected to dot the "i" for that specific game must give up their spot in order for an honorary member to dot the "i".

On November 19, 2011, Jon Woods, the marching band's director for the previous 28 years, dotted the "i" in his final home game directing the band, becoming the only non-band member to dot the "i" during a game where the OSUMB performed Script Ohio twice. The first Script Ohio of that game in its traditional pregame spot featured senior sousaphone player Jonathan Lampley dotting the "i". Woods dotted the "i" in a special second performance of Script Ohio during halftime.

Although not the famous Script Ohio formation, John Glenn and his wife Annie Glenn returned to Ohio Stadium on September 22, 2012, to dot the "i" in the word America during a NASA-themed halftime show paying tribute to Glenn's NASA accomplishments and time as an Ohio senator.

Diamond Ohio
The Diamond Ohio logo, which is created by superimposing the I over the center of the H, and making the O's into pointed triangles, was first created by the OSUMB in the late 1930s. The band continues to use this formation today at every home football game as the team entrance tunnel. The Ohio University Marching 110 has also used the Diamond Ohio logo since 1966 when director Gene Thrailkill designed a pregame set modeled after the Ohio State University Marching Band to give the newly reformed Marching 110 a symbol. Photographs show former OSUMB director Manley Whitcomb (1939-1942, 1946-1951) charting this formation on a table lined with field markings, and other photographs depict the band in performance of the Diamond Ohio as far back as 1939.

Skull Session

The first Skull Session held at St. John Arena was in 1957. Prior to this, Skull Session was nothing more than a final run through of the music on the morning of the game. Originally, these were closed rehearsals that the band eventually opened up to friends and family members. Each week, more and more people showed up to hear the band rehearse that the director, Jack Evans, decided to move the rehearsal to St. John Arena across the street. Today, upwards of 14,000 people pack St. John Arena every home game to see the band and football team. Many of these people do not even have tickets to the game, yet travel hours just for a chance to see and hear the band.

During the Skull Session, fans are treated to a variety of activities. Each week the band's "cheer groups" perform a song to go along with the football team's opponent of the week. The cheer groups are selected from their respective sections: Trumpet Cheers (the oldest Cheer Group), Flugelhorn Cheers, Trombone Cheers, Horn Cheers, Baritone Cheers, Stadium Brass (an instrument from every part of the band except percussion), Percussion Cheers (often playing Wipeout), the Tuba-Fours, and the E-Fours (similar to the Tuba-Fours, but composed of E-Flat Cornets). At some point after these performances, the football team enters to the sounds of James Swearingen's "Fanfare for a New Era". Immediately after their entrance a pre-selected senior football player speaks to the band and fans in St. John Arena followed by the head coach. The team then exits to the sounds of "Hang On, Sloopy!" Upon the football team's exit, the band commences with the traditions associated with the Skull Session. This includes performance of “(Fight the Team) Across the Field” first softly and slowly, and on the repeat of the chorus, at the well-known tempo and dynamics. The band is also known for performing “Eternal Father, Strong to Save,” otherwise known as “The Navy Hymn,” to formally begin every Skull Session concert. If a visiting band is in attendance they will perform their pre-game and halftime show, followed by the OSUMB's performance of pre-game and halftime. 

There is often a visiting Ohio high school band that will play before the Skull Session, as well as a feature during the Skull Session. The OSU Athletic Band also performs at a Skull Session once per season, trading off with the guest high school band. The Athletic Band is run by the same band staff as the marching band, and often has many students who perform in both. Starting in 2021, Skull Session is livestreamed on Youtube.

Ramp entrance
The ramp entrance is one of the most highly regarded traditions among band members, and is infamous for being very physically demanding. The ramp entrance starts with around 19:45 remaining on the countdown clock. A short video is shown on the scoreboard prior to the band emerging from the ramp tunnel. At the end of this video, Diamond Ohio appears on the screen. This is the cue for the percussion section to start down the ramp.

The percussion section is the first to march down the ramp, and onto the field; not to cadences, rather, silently, at a precise tempo of 180 beats per minute (bpm), and the snare drums perform a unique arm swing. A series of elaborately timed flanking maneuvers called the “power V” leads JI Row into their file in the block.

The "Ramp" cadence is then played exactly 17 times in a row, also at 180 bpm, as the other rows in the band file down the ramp, onto the field, and into their positions. Once a row is placed, the members mark time until all rows are into position.

As the final two rows, T and X file in, their squad leaders nod to the two sousaphone (KL Row) squad leaders, who then sound a loud blast on their whistles. The entire band responds to this call with a deafening yell of "Whistle!" After the last Ramp cadence, a roll-off is played, while the entire band (except JI Row) performs a conversion step maneuver, and a horns-up.

The band proceeds to play the intro of “Buckeye Battle Cry" while marking time. This is followed by the verse, while the band goes into what is referred to as a "half-time step" (mark time); one step per every two beats. During the verse, a member's leg lift (completion of a full chair step) is crucial for a clean and precise look. Also, during the verse, KL Row performs a special horn flash in which they tilt their bells slightly back, and swing their entire upper body, including their horn, to the tempo of their step. The KL row horn flash is based on the horn swing that OSUMB sousaphones did while marching until the 1970s.

After the completion of the verse, the band proceeds to march southward down the field to two choruses of Buckeye Battle Cry. The band then executes a "halt, kick, down", followed by a "step-forward about-face". At this point, the Drum Major runs back through the band, blowing a short whistle to the lead snare drummer, who initiates a roll-off to begin the rest of the pregame show, which includes playing the visiting team's fight song, Script Ohio, Carmen Ohio, and The Star-Spangled Banner, which is typically conducted by the visiting band's director, or a staff member of the OSU School of Music.

Back bend
During the introduction and verse of "Buckeye Battle Cry", the drum major enters the stadium running down the ramp, then struts through the band and comes to the front of the ranks where they execute a back bend, forming their body into the shape of an O. After a dramatic pause, the drum major’s plume - or on special occasions, such as before the annual rivalry game against Michigan, the entire top of the drum major's hat - touches the turf, just before the band begins to play two choruses of “Buckeye Battle Cry” while marching toward the south end zone. The drum major reaches the end zone and tosses the baton over the goal post as the band finishes the downfield march.

Neutron Man
Orlas King (1942-2004), also known as the Neutron Man, would burst into original dances whenever the band played the Pointer Sisters' "Neutron Dance."

Filmography

Accolades
The Ohio State University Marching Band has been honored with The Sudler Trophy for outstanding college band, and in 1988 was featured in a multi-page article in USA Today.

The band has also performed in seven Inaugural Parades. The band represented the State of Ohio during the inaugurations of Herbert Hoover, Richard Nixon (1969 and 1973), George H. W. Bush, George W. Bush (2001 and 2005), and Barack Obama (2009).

In 2006, the Marching Band was featured during a taping of The Daily Show With Jon Stewart. Stewart brought his program to Columbus to spotlight Ohio's 2006 gubernatorial race. The band performed an arrangement of the show's theme music, and was featured during the closing segment known as the "Moment of Zen."

During the October 6, 2012 football game between the University of Nebraska–Lincoln and Ohio State, the Band performed a tribute to video games, containing music from games such as Pokémon, Super Mario Bros., Halo, Tetris, Pac-Man and The Legend of Zelda. During the performance, the band executed formations based on these video games, including a falling set of Tetris blocks, and an animated galloping figure of the horse Epona.  A fan's recording of the performance posted to YouTube the next day soon became a viral video, spread in part through video game fans that were directed to the video. The band's interim director at the time, Jon Waters, had planned for the performance based on the national broadcast of the night game, and that the video game theme would resonate with the college students that had grown up with the games. With the widespread attention to the performance, the school promoted Waters from interim to permanent band director.

The show for the September 7, 2013 game against San Diego State University, put together on four days' notice, featured music from television game shows The Price Is Right, Family Feud, Jeopardy!, and Wheel of Fortune, as well as jabs at the University of Michigan. The September 28, 2013 game against the University of Wisconsin featured a Country and Western themed show which received numerous accolades for a formation of a singing cowboy removing his hat, as well as a steam locomotive racing across the field. For the Homecoming game on October 19 against the University of Iowa, the band performed a tribute to Michael Jackson, featuring the OSU Gospel Voices choir for "Man in the Mirror." During the show, band members performed individual moonwalks, and also created an image of Michael Jackson performing a Moonwalk across the field, complete with sequined glove. This tribute has been seen on YouTube by well over 8 million people, and was featured on many television programs and newspapers. The performance even attracted the attention of Katherine Jackson, Michael's mother. She was quoted as being very thankful and gracious for the band's performance of Michael's music.

However, the accolades did not stop there. With four days of preparation, the band performed a movie-themed halftime show at the October 26 game against Pennsylvania State University. This performance featured music from Superman, Harry Potter, Jurassic Park, and Pirates of the Caribbean. Formations performed included an image of Superman righting and steadying a collapsing building, and Harry Potter on a broomstick chasing a Snitch during a game of Quidditch.

The 2014 marching band season was difficult for band members and staff alike, with an interim directing staff and the national spotlight being turned on the program in a negative light due to the release of a report by the University claiming a "sexualized" culture. Many people in the media questioned whether the 2014 band would be able to continue to impress audiences without the leadership of Jon Waters. The band took to the field in Baltimore for the season opener against the United States Naval Academy. This condensed show featured much more traditional military-band style symmetrical drill that emphasized precision. The band also created an image of soldiers marching with a Civil War regimental flag. The band also played the Navy service song and formed a floating anchor, a formation first performed by the OSUMB in 1934, also at a game versus the Naval Academy in Baltimore. This show ended with a double Script Ohio. The show was well received by fans from both schools and was featured in national headlines for being the first performance of the band since the termination of their director.

For the first home game of 2014, the band performed a tribute to classic television shows titled "TV Land, Too!", with music from Dragnet, The Simpsons, The Addams Family, M*A*S*H, I Dream of Jeannie, The Office, Game of Thrones, Hawaii Five-O, The Brady Bunch, and The Lone Ranger. Drill selections included Bart Simpson on a skateboard, Thing waving to the audience, a helicopter blowing up a Michigan Block M, a costumed Jeannie appearing from her magic bottle, costumed Brady Bunch characters in their trademark squares, a fire-breathing dragon, and the Lone Ranger's horse Silver galloping across the field. The show instantly went viral, drawing praise from TV Land and actor Tom Hanks.

The second home game featured the annual Alumni Reunion. The largest turnout of band alumni to date prompted the band staff to feature both bands on the field for a substantial portion of the show. The show theme was D-Day, celebrating the 70th anniversary of the U.S. invasion of Normandy. Selections included "This is My Country", "American Patrol", a medley of military service songs, and "America the Beautiful". The band formed an animation of the famous image of a sailor kissing a woman in New York City upon returning home from the war, an army tank, ship anchor, the planting of the American flag on Iwo Jima, a classic twin engine bomber aircraft, and a coast guard boat. The nearly 800 band alumni framed the current band during most of their formations. This show also received national acclaim, particularly for its proximity to the anniversary of the September 11, 2001 terrorist attacks.

Later that year, the band would perform at the first College Football Playoff National Championship, with Ohio State defeating Oregon 42-20.

In 2018, the band represented the state of Ohio in the Macy’s Thanksgiving Day Parade.

The band has also appeared in the Rose Parade and at the Rose Bowl Game 15 times, with its most recent appearance in 2022.

References

External links

 
 Refuting the claim that Michigan performed the first Script Ohio
 Photo of original Ohio Theatre sign, source for Script Ohio design. Library of Congress.
 Ohio State Marching Band plays the National Anthem at 9/27/2014 Skull Session OSU vs UC on YouTube

Marching Band
Marching Band
Big Ten Conference marching bands
Musical groups established in 1878
Ohio State University musical groups
1878 establishments in Ohio